, formerly  and , is a Japanese female vocal group associated with a chain of maid cafés and restaurants called Afilia Group. Its members represent (work at) shops in the Tokyo districts of Ikebukuro, Ueno, Roppongi and Shinjuku. The group is jointly produced by Chiyomaru Shikura and voice actress and singer Haruko Momoi. People who have written songs for the group include Tsunku and Kōsuke Ōjima.

Overview and history 
The group was formed in 2008 and is conceived as an "academy-type vocal unit" consisting of girls selected from establishments belonging to Afilia Group, a nationwide cafe and restaurant network. It is jointly produced by two people, Chiyomaru Shikura and voice actress and singer Haruko Momoi. The group employs a line-up changing system with members joining and leaving.

On March 28, 2012, Afilia Saga East released its 7th single, titled "Mirai no Watashi o Matteiru" ("There's a Future Waiting for Me"). The title song was written by Tsunku and composed by Chiyomaru Shikura. At the time, the group was composed of 14 members, the maximum number since its creation. The single became the group's first to enter the top 10 of the Oricon weekly charts.

As of March 24, 2013, the group is composed of 11 members. Afilia Saga sung the ending theme for the TV animation series Hyperdimension Neptunia: The Animation, as well as the opening theme for another series, My Mental Choices are Completely Interfering with my School Romantic Comedy.

On June 3, 2017, the group changed their name to "Junjō no Afilia".

On June 12, 2019, their kanji surnames were added and their names changed.

Members

Current members

Former members 
 
 
 
 
 
 
 
 
 
 
  (until May 2009)
  (until August 2009)
  (May 2009 — September 2009)
  (until December 2009)
  (until March 2010)
  (until March 2012)
  (until March 2012)
 　(October 2010 — September 2012)
  (August 2009 — February 2013)
  (May 2009 — March 2013)

Timeline 

Pink - renamed to Afilia Saga

Purple - renamed to Junjou no Afilia

Discography

Singles

Albums

Live DVDs

Other DVDs

References

External links 
 

Japanese girl groups
Japanese idol groups
Japanese pop music groups
Musical groups established in 2008
2008 establishments in Japan
Musical groups from Tokyo
Warner Music Japan artists